Ditrichum cornubicum, commonly known as the Cornish path-moss, is a moss endemic to Cornwall, United Kingdom. First discovered in 1963, on a roadside west of Lanner, Cornwall by Jean Paton, it has since been found in two other places within Cornwall. It was published as new to science in 1976.

Distribution, habitat and conservation
In 1963, a local bryologist Jean Paton, found an unknown specimen at a roadside to the west of Lanner, near Redruth, in west Cornwall. It was on mine spoil used to surface a small roadside lay-by. It has not been re-found at Lanner but two years later, in 1965 she found the same species at a disused copper mine on the south-east edge of Bodmin Moor at Minions. In 1997 David Holyoak found another population nearby at Crow's Nest. A small population discovered in west Cork, Ireland is likely to have been an accidental introduction from Cornwall and appears to have disappeared. The entire world population of this species covers only 0.16msq and it currently a focus species within the Back from the Brink conservation project which aims to halt its decline and stop its extinction.

Ecology
Only male plants have been found and reproduction is asexual with new plants growing from the leaf axil of rhizoid tubers. The moss is intolerant of competition from other plants and grows on compacted, sparsely vegetated ground, usually on or besides old paths, along tracks, occasionally on banks, as well as the crevices of old walls. The soils are humic or loamy, well drained and acid with a pH of 5.5 – 5.8. It likes a metal-rich substrate with concentrations of copper of 151 – 1400 parts per million (ppm). As the metals slowly leach out of the soil by weathering, other mosses can colonise and out-compete D cornubicum. These mosses include Rhytidiadelphus squarrosus and Ceratodon purpureus.

References

External links

  Back from the brink

Dicranales
Bodmin Moor
Endangered plants
Endemic flora of England
Environment of Cornwall
Plants described in 1976